Austin Country Club is a private golf club in the southern United States, located in Austin, Texas. Established  in 1899, the club moved to its third and present site in 1984, a challenging layout designed by noted course architect Pete Dye.

The present Davenport Ranch site is west of central Austin on the south bank of the Colorado River (Lake Austin), just southeast of the Pennybacker Bridge. Following a renovation in 2015, it has hosted the WGC Match Play championship since 2016.

The previous location was in east Austin and is now the public Riverside Golf Course, adjacent to the Riverside campus of Austin Community College. Expansion of the college altered several holes, but the majority of the course is intact.  At this location, Austin Country Club spawned major champions Ben Crenshaw and Tom Kite, coached by teaching professional Harvey Penick.

Prior to 1950, the club was at 41st Street, northeast of the University of Texas campus. The nine-hole Hancock municipal course remains, but the other holes were developed into a shopping center.

Scorecard

References

External links

SkyGolf – scorecard – Austin Country Club
Riverside Golf Course – second location (1950–1984)
City of Austin: Hancock Golf Course – original club location

Golf clubs and courses in Texas
Sports venues in Austin, Texas
1899 establishments in Texas